Halityle regularis, commonly known as the mosaic cushion star, is a species of sea star in the family Oreasteridae. It is the sole species in the genus Halityle.

Distribution
The mosaic cushion star is found in the Western Central Pacific in countries such as the Philippines. It is found in tropical climates in depths of 3–90 meters.

References

Oreasteridae
Monotypic echinoderm genera
Asteroidea genera